Tom Reichelt (born 12 May 1982 in Marienberg, Saxony) is a German cross country skier who has competed since 2001. At the 2010 Winter Olympics in Vancouver, he finished 35th in the 30 km mixed pursuit and 46th in the 15 km events.

Reichelt's best finish at the FIS Nordic World Ski Championships was 18th in the 50 km event at Sapporo in 2007.

His best World Cup finish was third twice, once in 2006 and the other in 2008.

Cross-country skiing results
All results are sourced from the International Ski Federation (FIS).

Olympic Games

World Championships

World Cup

Season standings

Individual podiums
2 podiums – (1 , 1 )

Team podiums
 2 podiums – (2 )

References

External links

1982 births
Living people
People from Marienberg
Cross-country skiers at the 2010 Winter Olympics
German male cross-country skiers
Tour de Ski skiers
Olympic cross-country skiers of Germany
Sportspeople from Saxony
21st-century German people